Przecznica  is a village in the administrative district of Gmina Mirsk, within Lwówek Śląski County, Lower Silesian Voivodeship, in south-western Poland, close to the Czech border. Prior to 1945 it was in Germany.

The village has a population of 307.

Bibliography
Birecki T., 1959, "Złoże cyny w Przecznicy (Dolny Śląsk)." [Lode Of Tin Ore In Przecznica (Lower Silesia)]; in: Zeszyty Naukowe AGH, No. 22, Geologia vol.3, pp. 35–53, Kraków (in Polish)

External links
 Przecznica in Wratislaviae Amici (in Polish)
 Web page about Przecznica (Germ. Querbach) in Gory Izerskie (Germ. Isergebirge) (in Polish and German)

Przecznica